IRIS Khanjar is a  in the Southern Fleet of the Islamic Republic of Iran Navy.

Construction and commissioning 
Neyzeh was built by French Constructions Mécaniques de Normandie at Cherbourg, as one of the second six contracted on 14 October 1974. Her keel was laid down on 17 January 1977 and on 27 April 1978, she was launched. France decided to release the three, and all were commissioned into the fleet on 1 August 1981.

Service history 
In 2014, Khanjar and  participated in a joint naval drill with Pakistan Navy in the Gulf of Oman. On 7 September 2016, she was dispatched –as part of the 43rd flotilla, along with her sister , amphibious vessel  and support ship – to secure international waters sailed by Iranian commercial ships, and on 28 September, she arrived in Karachi, Pakistan for a three-day port visit. The ship was modernized in 2017–2021.

See also 

 List of current ships of the Islamic Republic of Iran Navy
 List of military equipment manufactured in Iran

References 

Missile boats of the Islamic Republic of Iran Navy
Ships built at Shahid Tamjidi shipyard
Ships of the Islamic Republic of Iran Navy
Ships built in Iran
Missile boats of Iran
1978 ships
Ships built in France
Iran–Iraq War naval ships of Iran